This is a list of Time Team episodes from series 20. The series was released on DVD (region 2) in 2014.

Episode

Series 20

Episode # refers to the air date order. The Time Team Specials are aired in between regular episodes, but are omitted from this list. Regular contributors on Time Team include: Tony Robinson (presenter); archaeologists Phil Harding, Helen Geake, Neil Holbrook, Raksha Dave, Matt Williams, Tracy Smith, Naomi Sewpaul; Victor Ambrus (illustrator); Francis Pryor (historian); Stewart Ainsworth (landscape investigator); John Gater, Jimmy Adcock (geophysics); Paul Blinkhorn (pottery expert); Jackie McKinley (bone expert); Danni Wootton (small finds).

References

External links
Channel 4 Time Team episode features for series 20 including dig-reports and summaries by the archaeologists.
The Unofficial Time Team site Fan site

Time Team (Series 20)
2012 British television seasons
2013 British television seasons